GSB may refer to:

Education
 German Scholars Boston
 German School Brooklyn
 Gill St. Bernard's School, in Gladstone, New Jersey
 Government School, Bidhwan, in India
 Stanford Graduate School of Business
 University of Cape Town Graduate School of Business
 University of Chicago Graduate School of Business

Science
 Geological Survey of Bangladesh
 Geological Survey of Belgium
 Green sulfur bacteria

Other
 Gaud Saraswat Brahmin, an Indian Brahmin community
 Giusfredi–Bianchi, a cycling team
 Gold Star for Bravery, an award of South Africa
 Government Savings Bank (Thailand)
 Granada Sky Broadcasting, a British television company
 Grivel Scarpa Binding, in mountaineering
 Guiding and Scouting in Belgium
 Greyhound Stud Book, national registration association for British Bred greyhounds 
 Gençlik ve Spor Bakanlığı, the Turkish Ministry of Youth and Sports